Korfball Australia is the governing body for the sport of Korfball in Australia.

The national body has eight state member associations. Korfball Australia is responsible for organising the various National Teams to compete in international competition, as well as organising the National Club Championships, the peak domestic competition.

See also
Australia national korfball team

References

External links
 

Sports governing bodies in Australia
Korfball in Australia
Korfball governing bodies